Humanity is the debut album from Japanese hardcore punk group The Mad Capsule Markets. They later re-released the album in 1996, and this was the only full album that guitarist Minoru Kojima played on. This album contains the original version of the songs "San Byoukan no Jisatsu" and "Life Game", which both appear in censored form on the album "P.O.P". The  original version of "San Byoukan no Jisatsu" contains an extra line in the chorus about jumping off a building. It was never made certain why the line was removed on "P.O.P", but it was speculated that the song was linked to Japanese teen suicide, and therefore censored on "P.O.P" and has been totally silenced on the re-release of "Humanity" and releases thereafter. The band or record company would later erase any further reference of it from on the insert for the re-release of "Humanity" also, as the word "Jisatsu" (suicide) on the track list has been scribbled out.

The original pressing of the album came with a free newspaper clipping, which had lyrics and photos of the band. The lyrics where otherwise later reprinted in P.O.P or the re-released version of the album.

Track listing
 – 2:27
 – 2:54
"Life Game" – 4:06
 – 2:16
 – 3:14
"Humanity" – 3:19
 – 2:28
 – 4:38
 – 2:15
 – 2:15
 – 4:16
 – 0:20

References 

The Mad Capsule Markets albums
1990 debut albums